This is a list of Federal District Metro (Brazil) stations, excluding abandoned, projected, planned stations, and those under construction.

List of active stations

References

Federal District